|}

This is a list of electoral district results for the Queensland 1995 election.

Results by electoral district

Albert

Archerfield

Ashgrove

Aspley

Barambah

Barron River

Beaudesert

Brisbane Central

Broadwater

Bulimba

Bundaberg

Bundamba

Burdekin

Burleigh

Burnett

Caboolture

Cairns

Callide

Caloundra

Capalaba

Charters Towers

Chatsworth

Chermside

Clayfield

Cleveland

Cook

Crows Nest

Cunningham

Currumbin

Everton

Ferny Grove

Fitzroy

Gladstone

Greenslopes

Gregory

Gympie

Hervey Bay

Hinchinbrook

Inala

Indooroopilly

Ipswich

Ipswich West

Kallangur

Kedron

Keppel

Kurwongbah

Lockyer

Logan

Lytton

Mackay

Mansfield

Maroochydore

Maryborough

Merrimac

Mirani

Moggill

Mooloolah

Mount Coot-tha

Mount Gravatt

Mount Isa

Mount Ommaney

Mulgrave

Mundingburra 

 This result was overturned by the Court of Disputed Returns and was recontested at the 1996 Mundingburra state by-election.

Murrumba

Nerang

Nicklin

Noosa

Nudgee

Redcliffe

Redlands

Rockhampton

Sandgate

South Brisbane

Southport

Springwood

Sunnybank

Surfers Paradise

Tablelands

Thuringowa

Toowoomba North

Toowoomba South

Townsville

Warrego

Warwick

Waterford

Western Downs

Whitsunday

Woodridge

Yeronga

See also 

 1995 Queensland state election
 Candidates of the Queensland state election, 1995
 Members of the Queensland Legislative Assembly, 1995-1998

References 

Results of Queensland elections